The 1914–15 Illinois Fighting Illini men's basketball team represented the University of Illinois.

Regular season
Coached by Ralph Jones, the 1914–15 Fighting Illini men's basketball team became the first undefeated Big Ten champion in the history of the school as well as the fourth Big Ten National Champion.  That 1915
season was the third in the eight-year tenure of head coach Ralph Jones and it produced the only unbeaten season in Illini history and the first Big Ten title for the Illinois basketball program. The Illinois team was retroactively named national champions by the Helms Athletic Foundation and the Premo-Porretta Power Poll. Jones’ 1915 team scored twice as many points as its opponents and won the conference title by three games over Chicago. The arrival of the Woods brothers in 1914 had a lot to do with the success of this era. Guard Ray Woods was named first-team All-America all three years he competed (1915–17), and twin brother Ralf, a forward, led the team in scoring in both 1916 and 1917. His consistency at the free throw line led to the establishment
of the Ralf Woods Award, which is still given annually to the Fighting Illini player with the best free-throw percentage. The starting lineup included Frank Bane at center, Clyde Alwood and Edward Allan Williford at the forward positions, captain Sven Duner at guard and brothers Ralf Woods and Ray Woods.  Ray Woods was named an All-American during this season.

Roster

Source

Schedule
												
Source																

|-	
!colspan=12 style="background:#DF4E38; color:white;"| Non-Conference regular season
|- align="center" bgcolor=""

			

|-	
!colspan=9 style="background:#DF4E38; color:#FFFFFF;"|Big Ten regular season	

Bold Italic connotes conference game

Player stats

Awards and honors
Ray Woods was elected to the "Illini Men's Basketball All-Century Team" in 2004. Woods was also selected as an All-American for the 1914–15 season.

References

Illinois Fighting Illini
Illinois Fighting Illini men's basketball seasons
NCAA Division I men's basketball tournament championship seasons
1914 in sports in Illinois
1915 in sports in Illinois